Saginaw Township South was a census-designated place (CDP) in Saginaw County in the U.S. state of Michigan.  The CDP was defined for statistical purposes and had no legal status as an incorporated municipality. The population was 13,801 at the 2000 census. The community is located within Saginaw Charter Township and consists of the township south of State St., while Saginaw Township North is most of the area north of State St. This division is purely for statistical purposes and does not reflect any present or historical self-identification of the residents in these areas.

Geography

Demographics
As of the census of 2000, there were 13,801 people, 6,079 households, and 3,860 families residing in the CDP. The racial makeup of the CDP was 89.86% White, 5.36% Black or African American, 0.25% Native American, 1.96% Asian, 0.01% Pacific Islander, 1.26% from other races, and 1.30% from two or more races. Hispanic or Latino of any race were 4.41% of the population.

There were 6,079 households, out of which 26.0% had children under the age of 18 living with them, 52.7% were married couples living together, 8.5% had a female householder with no husband present, and 36.5% were non-families. 32.0% of all households were made up of individuals, and 15.0% had someone living alone who was 65 years of age or older.  The average household size was 2.27 and the average family size was 2.88.

In the CDP, the population was spread out, with 21.8% under the age of 18, 7.6% from 18 to 24, 25.0% from 25 to 44, 26.8% from 45 to 64, and 18.8% who were 65 years of age or older.  The median age was 42 years. For every 100 females, there were 90.1 males.  For every 100 females age 18 and over, there were 86.8 males.

The median income for a household in the CDP was $48,605, and the median income for a family was $64,137. Males had a median income of $49,977 versus $30,968 for females. The per capita income for the CDP was $28,012.  About 4.8% of families and 6.0% of the population were below the poverty line, including 6.6% of those under age 18 and 6.7% of those age 65 or over.

References

Former census-designated places in Michigan
Unincorporated communities in Saginaw County, Michigan
Unincorporated communities in Michigan